Midy is a surname.

List of people with the surname 

 Arthur Midy (1877–1944), French painter
 Paul Midy (born 1982), French politician

See also 

 Midy's theorem
 Irisbus Midys

Surnames
Surnames of French origin
French-language surnames